Frank M. De Jiulio, Jr (born August 22, 1989) is an American former professional baseball pitcher. He attended Daytona Beach Community College and the University of Tampa.  De Jiulio was selected three different times in the Major League Baseball Draft. In the 44th round of the 2009 Draft by the Chicago Cubs, in the 45th round of the 2010 Draft by the Cleveland Indians and in the 38th round of the 2011 Draft by the Los Angeles Angels of Anaheim.

De Jiulio played in the Angels farm system in 2011 and 2012, playing in a combined 48 games (15 starts) with a 6–9 record and 7.21 ERA. After his release by the Angels, he played in the United League Baseball for the Edinburg Roadrunners (2013), Frontier League for the Frontier Greys (2014), and Atlantic League of Professional Baseball for the Long Island Ducks (2015–2016) and Bridgeport Bluefish (2016). He re-signed with Bridgeport for the 2017 season. On November 1, 2017, DeJiulio was drafted by the York Revolution in the Bridgeport Bluefish dispersal draft. On February 7, 2018, he signed with the York Revolution for the 2018 season. He became a free agent following the 2018 season. 

De Jiulio was selected as a member of the Italy national baseball team at the 2017 World Baseball Classic.

References

External links

Living people
1989 births
Baseball pitchers
Arizona League Angels players
Inland Empire 66ers of San Bernardino players
Cedar Rapids Kernels players
Edinburg Roadrunners players
Frontier Greys players
Long Island Ducks players
Gigantes de Carolina players
Bridgeport Bluefish players
2017 World Baseball Classic players
Tampa Spartans baseball players
Daytona State Falcons baseball players
York Revolution players